The 1928 SANFL Grand Final was an Australian rules football competition. Port Adelaide beat Norwood 104 to 56.

References 

SANFL Grand Finals
SANFL Grand Final, 1928